Jeff Causey  (born October 19, 1971 in Manassas, Virginia) is a retired American soccer goalkeeper who spent six seasons in Major League Soccer.  He later served as an assistant coach at the collegiate and professional levels.

College soccer
Causey attended the University of Virginia where he played on the men’s soccer team from 1990 to 1993.  He was a member of the Cavaliers teams which won the 1991, 1992, and 1993 NCAA Championships, taking Tournament Defensive MVP in 1991.  He was a 1993 third team All American, graduating that year with a bachelor's degree in history.  He holds the school record for 88 saves in the 1990 season and is tied for third with 10 shutouts that season.

Professional career
In 1994, Causey signed with the Boston Storm of the USISL.  In 1994, he moved to the Richmond Kickers, winning the 1995 USISL Championship and US Open Cup Championship.

On February 6, 1996, the Kansas City Wiz selected Causey in the 5th round (46th overall) in the 1996 MLS Inaugural Player Draft.  The team then traded him to D.C. United in exchange for Garth Lagerway and the first overall pick in the 1996 MLS College Draft.  Causey played nineteen games with United in 1996 as the team won both the MLS Cup and Open Cup.  He began the year with United, but was waived on June 27, 1997.  On July 20, 1997, Causey signed with the New England Revolution.  Causey was a part of the New England Revolution until April 2002 when he retired from playing professionally.

Causey was actively involved in the community and in 2000 & 2001, he received the New York Life "Humanitarian of the Year" as well the 2001 Boston Sports Awards "Ron Burton Community Hero".  In 2008, Causey was inducted into the New England Soccer Hall of Fame.

Coach
In 1995, Causey served as an assistant coach with the University of Virginia’s soccer team.  On May 7, 2002, the University of Maryland, College Park announced it had hired Causey as an assistant with the men’s soccer team.  In 2003, he was an assistant coach with the Boston Breakers in the WUSA.  With the collapse of the WUSA, Causey went into the financial services sector with Smith Barney in Manchester, New Hampshire.  At the present time he is a Certified Financial Planner with TIAA-CREF.  On January 19, 2012, it was announced that Causey would be joining the New England Revolution broadcast team for the 2012 season.  Causey is still involved in soccer, coaching youth teams and players in the Massachusetts and New Hampshire area. He coaches good goalkeepers like Ryker Fauth, Jose Goodman, Reinner Federals, and Sean Cory.

References

External links
 

1971 births
Living people
American soccer coaches
American soccer players
Association football goalkeepers
Virginia Cavaliers men's soccer players
USISL players
Boston Storm players
Richmond Kickers players
D.C. United players
New England Revolution players
Boston Breakers (WUSA) non-playing staff
Virginia Cavaliers men's soccer coaches
Maryland Terrapins men's soccer coaches
NCAA Division I Men's Soccer Tournament Most Outstanding Player winners
Soccer players from Virginia
Major League Soccer players
MLS Pro-40 players
American women's soccer coaches